= Constituency MR-1 =

Pakistani political constituency

- Constituency for the Khyber Pakhtunkhwa Assembly

Current constituency
- Member: Soran Singh

MR-1 is a reserved constituency for minorities in the Khyber Pakhtunkhwa Assembly.
